In July 2014, an internationally publicised incident occurred in which a Thai woman, Pattaramon Janbua, who had been hired as a surrogate mother for an Australian couple, sought to raise money for her critically ill surrogate son. The baby had been in her care since she gave birth in December 2013; biological parents David John Farnell and Wenyu Wendy Li had left Thailand 2 months later with baby Gammy's twin sister Pipah.

When ultrasound results seven months into the surrogate pregnancy indicated that Ms Pattaramon was carrying twins and that one of the twins, a boy, had Down syndrome, Farnell and Li requested that she abort him, and that they would keep only the child's twin sister. Ms Pattaramon refused, citing her Buddhist beliefs, and instead opted to raise the boy (named Gammy) on her own. Thai surrogacy laws dictate that a child's legal mother is its birth mother. The Farnells returned to Australia in December 2013, bringing baby Gammy's twin sister Pipah with them.

After the story broke to media, donors amassed a fund of over $250,000 to help baby Gammy.

The incident raised questions about the ethics of gestational surrogacy. The fact that David Farnell is a convicted sex offender (he was sentenced to three years in prison in 1997 for molesting two girls aged 7 and 10) has also caused controversy. There were also rumors that the Farnells believed that Gammy had died, but this was not true; it was David Farnell's adult daughter who claimed that Gammy died and she did so because she thought it would be easier to explain it to her friends.

In response to the controversy, Thailand authorities reportedly banned surrogate babies from leaving the country with their parents. Hundreds of foreign couples were reported to have been affected. A law was also drafted making paid surrogacy a criminal offense in Thailand.

In response to the controversy, since July 30, 2015 Thailand has banned foreign residents from commercial surrogacy contract arrangements, under the Protection of Children Born from Assisted Reproductive Technologies Act. Only opposite-sex married couples as Thailand residents are allowed to have a commercial surrogacy contract arrangement. In past Thailand was a popular destination for couples seeking surrogate mothers.

A charity involved in the case has stated that David Farnell has tried to access the funds raised for Gammy. However, an inquest into Farnell and Li's contact with his daughter by Australian authorities found that there was no evidence to suggest Farnell ever attempted to access the funds set aside for Gammy.    Additionally, it was found Farnell and Li had attempted to bring Gammy home, but the surrogate mother initially had objections and had intended to adopt Gammy without Farnell and Li, so they had left Gammy behind in a mix-up of cultural and language barriers.

It was ruled Pipah is not allowed to be alone with David Farnell and the agreement that she must be read a photobook with age-appropriate language every three months for the foreseeable future that explains her father's offenses.

Gammy was later granted Australian citizenship on Janbua's application on the basis that Gammy's biological father David Farnell was Australian.

David Farnell died in July 2020, reportedly from an asbestos-related illness.

See also
 Google Baby (de)

References

Surrogacy
Thai surrogacy controversy
Surrogacy controversy
Down syndrome
Controversies in Australia
Controversies in Thailand